Ceratophora erdeleni, also known commonly as Erdelen's horned lizard or Erdelen's horn lizard, is a species of lizard in the family  Agamidae. The species is endemic to Sri Lanka. It has only a rudimentary "horn", that is occasionally missing altogether.

Etymology
The specific name, erdeleni, is in honor of German biologist Walter R. Erdelen.

Geographic range

Description
The head of C. erdeleni is oval, and longer than wide. The rostral appendage is oval and rudimentary (less than 18% snout length), and occasionally missing in both sexes. The tympanum is hidden under the skin. A weak dorso-nuchal crest is confined to the neck region. Lamellae under fourth toe are 24–28 in number. The dorsum is yellow, light brown, or reddish brown in color, with 17 broad dark brown crossbands on the body and tail that are separated by light narrow interspaces. The venter is yellowish green. Juveniles are green with black transverse bands.

Habitat and behavior
C. erdeleni inhabits rainforests in the midhills and is arboreal and diurnal.

Reproduction

References

Further reading
Pethiyagoda R, Manamendra-Arachchi K (1998). "A revision of the endemic Sri Lankan agamid lizard genus Ceratophora Gray, 1835, with description of two new species". Journal of South Asian Natural History 3 (1): 1-50. (Ceratophora erdeleni, new species).

External links
http://www.wildreach.com/reptile/Sauria/Ceratophora%20erdeleni.php
https://www.uniprot.org/uniprot/Q8WER4

erdeleni
Lizards of Asia
Reptiles of Sri Lanka
Endemic fauna of Sri Lanka
Reptiles described in 1998
Taxa named by Rohan Pethiyagoda